40 under 40 or Forty under 40 etc. may refer to:

 40 Under 40, annual list published in Fortune magazine
 Business Journals Forty Under 40, annual list published by American City Business Journals